George Mason III (1690March 5, 1735) was an American planter, military officer, legislator and government official. Although he repeatedly won election to represent Stafford County in the then-one-house Virginia General Assembly, he may today be best known as the father of George Mason IV, a Founding Father of the United States.

Early life
Mason was born in 1690 at Chopawamsic plantation in Stafford County, Virginia. He was the eldest son of George Mason II and his first wife Mary Fowke.

Planter and politician
At the time of his father's death in 1716, Mason was 27 and already a man of prominence in Stafford County. Like his father, Mason increased the family's property and social standing in Stafford County and across the Potomac River in Maryland by strategic marriage as well as continuing the family's traditions of leadership and public service. Like his father, Mason served as a colonel in the Stafford County militia and represented Stafford County as one of its two delegates in the House of Burgesses continually between 1715 and 1726. 

During his tenure as a burgess in Williamsburg, Mason met and married his wife Ann Stevens Thomson, whose family owned plantations in Maryland. Like his father and grandfather, this George Mason became Stafford's County Lieutenant of Stafford (in 1719), and also served as the county's sheriff.

Mason amassed enormous land holdings in Stafford, Fauquier, Prince William, and Fairfax counties in Virginia. Mason also increased his land holdings by acquiring large grants south of the Occoquan River, which were later named Woodbridge by his grandson Thomas Mason. Mason leased most of his properties out as smaller farms with their rent paid in tobacco yield. Mason also earned income from fisheries and a ferry service carrying King's Highway across the Occoquan River. Because Mason owned land on both sides of the Occoquan River, he enjoyed a monopoly on river crossings as well as on the fishing rights in Belmont Bay.

In 1716, Mason accompanied the "Knights of the Golden Horseshoe Expedition" led by Lt. Governor Alexander Spotswood across the Blue Ridge and into the Shenandoah Valley, where his famous son would invest.

Marriage and children
Mason married Ann Stevens Thomson, daughter of Stevens Thomson and his wife Dorothea, in 1721. The couple had three children:

George Mason IV (11 December 1725–7 October 1792)
Mary Thomson Mason Selden (1731–5 January 1758)
Thomson Mason (14 August 1733–26 February 1785)

A few years after his marriage to Ann, Mason moved his family to Stump Neck plantation in Charles County, Maryland, relegating the Chopawamsic estate in Stafford County, Virginia, to a secondary residence.

Later life
Mason drowned when a storm capsized his boat while crossing the Potomac River between plantations on 5 March 1735. Soon after his death, Mason's widow and children returned to Chopawamsic. When this George Mason died, he owned  in Stafford County alone.

References

1690 births
1735 deaths
American people of English descent
American planters
American slave owners
British North American Anglicans
Businesspeople from Maryland
Businesspeople from Virginia
Deaths by drowning
Deaths due to shipwreck
George Mason
House of Burgesses members
People of colonial Maryland
Mason family
People from Stafford County, Virginia
Virginia sheriffs